Baptodoris is a genus of sea slugs, dorid nudibranchs, shell-less marine gastropod mollusks in the family Discodorididae.

The genus Baptodoris was originally classified by Bergh in 1891 in the subfamily Platydorididae (despite the use of suffix -idea), a subfamily of the family Dorididae. In 1934 Alice Pruvot-Fol elevated this subfamily to its new status as family Platydorididae. In 2002 Valdés has given the name Discodorididae precedence over the name Platydorididae.

The Sea Slug Forum however classifies this genus in the family Dorididae.

Species 
Species in the genus Baptodoris include:
 Baptodoris cinnabarina Bergh, 1884  (junior synonym Platydoris maculata  Bouchet, 1977 ) - type species of the genus
 Baptodoris mimetica Gosliner, 1991
 Baptodoris peruviana (d'Orbigny, 1837)
 Baptodoris phinei Valdés, 2001 
 Baptodoris stomascuta (Bouchet, 1977) (originally Platydoris stomascuta  Bouchet, 1977 )
Species brought into synonymy
 Baptodoris perezi Llera & Ortea, 1982: synonym of Gargamella perezi (Llera & Ortea, 1982)

References

Discodorididae
Gastropod genera